Got Love (stylized as GOT♡) is the second extended play by South Korean boy band Got7. It was released on June 23, 2014 by JYP Entertainment. The song "A" was used to promote the EP. This EP notes the first to have a member participate in the lyric making, JB for "Bad Behaviour".

Track listing

Chart performance

Album chart

Singles
A

Sales

References 

2014 EPs
Dance-pop EPs
Korean-language EPs
JYP Entertainment EPs
Genie Music EPs
Got7 EPs